Joe Nelson was an English freestyle sport wrestler.

Wrestling career
He competed for England in the featherweight division at the 1934 British Empire Games in London where he won a silver medal.

He represented Lancashire.

References

British male sport wrestlers
Wrestlers at the 1934 British Empire Games
Commonwealth Games silver medallists for England
Commonwealth Games medallists in wrestling
Medallists at the 1934 British Empire Games